Maria Gray may refer to:

 Maria Emma Gray (1787–1876), English conchologist and algologist
 Maria Freeman Gray (1832–1915), American educator, feminist and socialist